The Zappeion is a large, palatial building next to the National Gardens of Athens in the heart of Athens, Greece. It is generally used for meetings and ceremonies, both official and private and is one of the city's most renowned modern landmarks.

Constructing the Zappeion
In 1869, the Greek Parliament allocated  of public land between the Palace Gardens and the ancient Temple of Olympian Zeus, and also passed a law on 30 November 1869, "for the building works of the Olympic Games", as the Zappeion was the first building to be erected specifically for the revival of the Olympic Games in the modern world. The ancient Panathenian stadium was also refurbished as part of the works for the Olympic Games. Following some delay, on 20 January 1874, the cornerstone of the building was laid; this new building would be designed by Danish architect Theophil Hansen. Finally, on 20 October 1888, the Zappeion opened. Unfortunately for its benefactor, Evangelis Zappas, he did not live long enough to see the Zappeion built, and his cousin Konstantinos Zappas was nominated by Evangelos Zappas to complete the building. The Austrian Parliament Building was also designed by Hansen and followed the same theme in the exterior.

History

The Zappeion was used during the 1896 Summer Olympics as the main fencing hall. A decade later, at the 1906 Intercalated Games, it was used as the Olympic Village. It served as the first host for the organizing committee (ATHOC) for the 2004 Games from 1998 to 1999 and served as the press center during the 2004 games. In 1938, the Athens Radio Station, the country's first national broadcaster, began operating in the premises. The building continued to house the National Radio Foundation until the inauguration of the House of Radio in 1970.

A number of historical events have taken place at the Zappeion, including the signing of the documents formalizing Greece's accession to the European Community in May, 1979, which took place in the building's marble-clad, peristyle main atrium.

The head of Evangelos Zappas is 'buried' inside a wall in the Zappeion.

Current Building Uses

The Zappeion is currently being used as a Conference and Exhibition Center for both public and private purposes.

Halls and Floor Plans

In numismatics
The Zappeion was recently selected as the main motif for high-value euro collectors' coins; the €100 Greek The Olympic Village Zappeion commemorative coin, minted in 2003 to commemorate the 2004 Summer Olympics. In the obverse of the coin, a front view of the building is depicted.

Statues
Various statues are placed in the gardens of the Zappeion area.

References

External links

Official Zappeion Megaron Website
Virtual Tour of the Zappeion
Zappeion Remodelling Project, 2000
Old Photos of Zappeion (now in archive.org)

History of the Olympic Village
Government buildings completed in 1888
Landmarks in Athens
Venues of the 1896 Summer Olympics
Olympic fencing venues
Theophil Hansen buildings
Convention centers in Greece
Neoclassical architecture in Greece